Bojewo  is a village in the administrative district of Gmina Sadowne, within Węgrów County, Masovian Voivodeship, in east-central Poland.
The peregrination to Bejewo (usually started in Vigo) has 3028 km.

References

Bojewo